Roy Anthony Jordan (born 17 April 1978) is an English professional footballer. He currently plays for Mercia Athletic.

Jordan began his career as a junior with Torquay United and had trials with Yeovil Town and Bristol Rovers before joining Hereford United as an apprentice in 1995. He made his league debut on 1 March 1997 in a 2–1 home defeat against Exeter City, and remained with the Bulls as they began life in the Conference, though Jordan played just once that season. He joined Newport County on loan, before moving to Merthyr Tydfil and then Hellenic League side Pegasus Juniors, whom he left in the 1999 close season to rejoin Newport County whilst working as a plumber. Including his previous loan spell he made 18 league appearances for Newport.

His next move took him to Gloucester City in March 2000 when he was signed without the knowledge of City manager Brian Hughes. His stay with Gloucester was brief as he had returned to play for Pegasus Juniors before the end of that season.

In August 2000 he was jailed for 28 days after being involved in a fight outside a pub in Hereford, and more specifically for kicking a man as he lay on the ground. On his release he joined West Midlands League side Kington Town, leaving for the first of a number of spells with Westfields in June 2002 after his release by Kington. chairmen

He later played for Worcester City. He left Westfields to join Telford United in January 2005, but rejoined Westfields in November the same year, having played six times in the league for Telford that season. He moved to Mercia Athletic in 2010.

References

Living people
1978 births
Footballers from Plymouth, Devon
English footballers
Hereford United F.C. players
Newport County A.F.C. players
Merthyr Tydfil F.C. players
Gloucester City A.F.C. players
Hereford Pegasus F.C. players
Kington Town F.C. players
Westfields F.C. players
Worcester City F.C. players
AFC Telford United players
English Football League players
Association football wingers